Sumeta Afzal Syed is a Pakistani politician who had been a Member of the Provincial Assembly of Sindh, from June 2013 to May 2018. She became the youngest female MPA at the age of 25 years in Sindh Assembly.

Early life and education
She was born on 1 April 1987 in Karachi.

She has earned the degree of Bachelor of Social Sciences in Psychology.

Political career

She was elected to the Provincial Assembly of Sindh as a candidate of Muttahida Qaumi Movement (MQM) on a reserved seat for women in 2013 Pakistani general election.

She quit MQM in April 2018 and joined Pak Sarzameen Party.

She joined Pakistan People's Party in March 2021 and now She is Advisor SDG Task Force Sindh.

References

Living people
Sindh MPAs 2013–2018
1987 births
21st-century Pakistani women politicians
Pak Sarzameen Party members